Wingspan is a 2020 strategy video game based on the board game Wingspan. It received mostly positive reviews critically and was well regarded commercially.

Release 

An early digital version of the tabletop game released in January 2019 on the tabletop simulator Tabletopia. It was subsequently released for PC and Switch in September 2020 and December 2020. In 2021, Android and iOS versions were also released.

Reception 

The game received "generally favorable" reviews according to the review aggregator Metacritic. PC Gamer rated the game 9/10, praising the mechanics and illustration positively comparing with the original board game. Gamezebo, however, preferred the original board game. The adaptation was commercially successful, with 125,000 combined copies sold Steam, Nintendo Switch, Xbox, and iOS.

References

Further reading 

 
 
 
 
 
 https://www.eurogamer.net/articles/2020-03-24-rezzed-digital-the-serene-strategy-of-wingspan-a-game-about-attracting-birds
 https://toucharcade.com/2021/10/14/wingspan-android-release-date-price-digital-board-game-birds/

External links 

 

2020 video games
Strategy video games
Video games about birds
Video games based on board games
Video games developed in Poland
Multiplayer and single-player video games
IOS games
MacOS games
Nintendo Switch games
Windows games
Xbox One games